Isabella Lucy Bird, married name Bishop  (15 October 1831 – 7 October 1904), was a nineteenth-century British explorer, writer, photographer, and naturalist. With Fanny Jane Butler she founded the John Bishop Memorial Hospital in Srinagar in today’s Kashmir. She was the first woman to be elected Fellow of the Royal Geographical Society.

Early life
Bird was born on 15 October 1831 in Boroughbridge Hall, Yorkshire, the home of her maternal grandmother and her father's first curacy after taking orders in 1821. Her parents were Rev Edward Bird and his second wife, Dora Lawson (1803–1866).  Her paternal grandparents were Lucy Wilberforce Bird and Robert Bird (cousins).

Bird moved several times during her childhood. In 1832, Reverend Bird was appointed curate in Maidenhead. Because of her father's ill health, Bird's family moved again in 1834 to Tattenhall in Cheshire, a living presented to him by his cousin Dr John Bird Sumner, Bishop of Chester, where in the same year Bird's sister, Henrietta, was born.
 
Bird was outspoken from an early age. When six years old, she confronted the local MP for South Cheshire, Sir Malpas de Grey Tatton Egerton, while he was campaigning, asking him "did you tell my father my sister was so pretty because you wanted his vote?"

Edward Bird's controversial views against Sunday labour caused his congregation to dwindle, and in 1842 he requested a transfer to St. Thomas's in Birmingham. Here again, objections were raised, which culminated in the minister being pelted "with stones, mud, and insults".

In 1848, the family moved again and, after spending some time in Eastbourne, took up residence in Wyton in Huntingdonshire (now Cambridgeshire.)

From early childhood, Bird was frail, suffering from a spinal complaint, nervous headaches, and insomnia. The doctor recommended an open-air life, and consequently, Bird learned to ride in infancy, and later to row. Her only education came from her parents: her father was a keen botanist who instructed Bird in flora, and her mother taught her daughters an eclectic mix of subjects. Bird became an avid reader. However, her "bright intelligence, [and] an extreme curiosity as to the world outside, made it impossible for her brain and her nature generally to be narrowed and stiffened by the strictly evangelical atmosphere of her childhood".

Isabella's first publication at the age of 16 was a pamphlet addressing free trade versus protectionism, after which she continued writing articles for various periodicals.

In 1850, a "fibrous tumour was removed from the neighbourhood of the spine". Bird continued to suffer from unspecified ailments resulting in lassitude and insomnia. The family spent six summers in Scotland in an effort to improve her health.

Doctors urged a sea voyage and in 1854, Bird's life of travelling began when the opportunity arose for her to sail to the United States, accompanying her second cousins to their family home. Her father "gave her [£]100 and leave to stay away as long as it lasted". Bird's "bright descriptive letters" written home to her relations formed the basis for her first book, An Englishwoman in America (1856), published by Murray. John Murray, "as well as being Isabella's lifelong publisher, ... [became] one of her closest friends".

Travels in middle life
 Bird left Britain again in 1872, going initially to Australia, which she disliked, and then to Hawaii (known in Europe as the Sandwich Islands), her love for which prompted her second book (published three years later). While there she climbed Mauna Kea and Mauna Loa. She then moved on to Colorado, where she had heard the air was excellent for the infirm. Dressed practically and riding not sidesaddle but frontwards like a man (though she threatened to sue the Times for saying she dressed like one), she covered over 800 miles in the Rocky Mountains in 1873. Her letters to her sister, first printed in the magazine The Leisure Hour, comprised Bird's fourth and perhaps most famous book, A Lady's Life in the Rocky Mountains.

Bird's time in the Rockies was enlivened especially by her acquaintance with Jim Nugent, "Rocky Mountain Jim", a textbook outlaw with one eye and an affinity for violence and poetry. "A man any woman might love but no sane woman would marry", Bird declared in a section excised from her letters before their publication. Nugent also seemed captivated by the independent-minded Bird, but she ultimately left the Rockies and her "dear desperado". Nugent was shot dead less than a year later.

At home, Bird again found herself pursued, this time by Dr John Bishop, an Edinburgh surgeon in his thirties. She got interested in Japan through John Francis Campbell's "My Circular Notes, 1876", and asked the advice of Colin Alexander McVean, former chief surveyor of Japan's Survey Office, in February 1878, then went travelling again, this time to Asia: Japan, China, Korea, Vietnam, Singapore, and Malaya. When her sister Henrietta Amelia Bird died of typhoid in 1880, Bird accepted John Bishop's marriage proposal. They were married in February 1881, and later that year she was awarded the Royal Order of Kapiolani by King Kalākaua of Hawaii. Bird's health took a severe turn for the worse but, other than a spell of scarlet fever in 1888, it recovered following John Bishop's death in 1886, at which point she inherited a large amount of disposable income. Feeling that her earlier travels had been hopelessly dilettante, Bird studied medicine and resolved to travel as a missionary. Despite being nearly 60 years of age, she set off for India.

Later life

Arriving on the subcontinent in February 1889, Bird visited missions in India, visited Ladakh on the borders of Tibet, and then travelled in Persia, Kurdistan, and Turkey. In India, the Maharajah of Kashmir gave her a piece of land on which to build a hospital with sixty beds and a dispensary for women; there she worked with Fanny Jane Butler to found the John Bishop Memorial Hospital in memory of her recently deceased husband who had left funds for this purpose in his will. The following year, she joined a group of British soldiers travelling between Baghdad and Tehran. She remained with the unit's commanding officer during his survey work in the region, armed with her revolver and a medicine chest supplied – in possibly an early example of corporate sponsorship – by Henry Wellcome's company in London. In 1891, she travelled through Baluchistan to Persia and Armenia, exploring the source of the Karun River and later that year, she gave a speech in a committee room of the House of Commons on the persecution of Christians in Kurdistan, on which she had made representations to the Grand Vizier of the Turkish Empire.

Featured in journals and magazines for decades, Bird had, by then, become a household name. In 1890, she became the first woman to be awarded Honorary Fellowship of the Royal Scottish Geographical Society. Two years later, she became the first woman allowed to join the Royal Geographical Society. She was elected to membership of the Royal Photographic Society on 12 January 1897. Her final great journey took place in 1897, when she travelled up the Yangtze and Han rivers in China and Korea, respectively. Later still, she went to Morocco, where she travelled among the Berbers and had to use a ladder to mount her black stallion, a gift from the Sultan.

Death

A few months after returning from a trip to Morocco, Bird fell ill and died at her home on 16 Melville Street, Edinburgh on 7 October 1904. She was buried with her family in Dean Cemetery in the west of the city. The grave lies in the small curved southern section, near the small path which divides it in two. She was planning another trip to China at the time of her death.

Legacy

The first biography of Bird was written by Anne M Stoddart and published in 1907.

Caryl Churchill used Bird as a character in her play Top Girls (1982). Much of the dialogue written by Churchill comes from Bird's own writings.

Bird was inducted into the Colorado Women's Hall of Fame in 1985.

Bird was featured in Bedrock: Writers on the Wonders of Geology (2006), edited by Lauret E. Savoy, Eldridge M. Moores, and Judith E. Moores (Trinity University Press) which looks at writing over the years and how it pays tribute to the Earth and its geological features.

Bird is also the main character of the manga Isabella Bird in Wonderland (Fushigi no Kuni no Bird), a novelization of her travels to Japan; it received a bilingual Japanese-English edition beginning in 2018.

The building of the clock tower on Tobermory, Mull harbour wall was funded by Bird in memory of her beloved sister Henrietta. It was designed by mountaineer and explorer Edward Whymper.

In December 2022, BBC Two broadcasts a television programme which dedicated to Isabella called Trailblazers: A Rocky Mountain Road Trip presented by Ruby Wax who undertook a road trip to retrace her steps in Colorado with Mel B and Emily Atack.

Works

 Notes on Old Edinburgh (1869)
 The Proverbs of the New Testament. The Sunday Magazine, October 1871
 Keble and His Hymns. The Sunday Magazine, December 1872
 Six Months in the Sandwich Islands, amongst the Palm Groves, Coral Reefs and Volcanoes (1874)
 Heathenism in the Hawaiian Islands. The Sunday Magazine, July 1875
 Christianity in the Hawaiian Islands. The Sunday Magazine, August 1875
 The Hawaiian Archipelago (1875)

 Notes on Travel. The Leisure Hour, December 1879

 A Lady's Winter Holiday in Ireland. Murray's Magazine, March 1888

 The Shadow of the Kurd. Contemporary Review, May 1891



References

Bibliography

External links

 
 
 
 
 Works by Bird at Open Library.
 Works by Isabella Bird listed at The Online Books Page
 Essays by Isabella Bird at Quotidiana.org
Works at the Victorian Women Writers Project
Isabella Lucy Bird (1898), Korea and Her Neighbours: A Narrative of Travel, with an Account of the Recent Vicissitudes and Present Position of the Country
Short radio script, Bear Encounter at California Legacy Project
Colorado Women's Hall of Fame
 Google Map: Isabella Bird's American Adventure- A Lady's Life in the Rocky Mountains

1831 births
1904 deaths
British expatriates in China
English travel writers
Women of the Victorian era
British women travel writers
People from Boroughbridge
Female explorers
Female travelers
English explorers
Fellows of the Royal Geographical Society
19th-century women writers